Carlos Torres Vila (9 November 1946 in Los Toldos, Buenos Aires – 16 July 2010 in San Miguel, Buenos Aires) was an Argentinian folk singer.

He was revelation in the festival of Baradero in 1969 and the Cosquín Festival in 1970.
He was one of the firsts solo to introduce the so-called "Romantic Folk", mix of traditional Argentine music and melodic songs.
Under this slope, he broke several sales records in the 1970s.
In 1977 he decided to dedicate only to the melodic music. His discs Consagración, Que romántico and Me vas a echar de menos are the proof.
In 1982 his LP El retorno de Carlos Torres Vila marks his return to his style, that he never left.
He died in the noon of 16 July 2010 in the Sarmiento Clinic in the city of San Miguel, Buenos Aires after a long illness. He couldn't present his last disc edited in 2009 and called El Autor.

Discography
 Muchacha - 1970
 La canción del te quiero - 1971
 Personalidad - 1972
 Que pasa entre los dos- 1973
 Te quiero solo mía - 1974
 Carlos Torres Vila - 1975
 Muchas veces por ti lloro - 1976
 Consagración - 1977
 Que romántico - 1979
 Me vas a echar de menos - 1981
 El retorno de Carlos Torres Vila - 1982
 Como antes - 1983
 Soledad - 1984
 Torres Vila ´86 - 1986
 Recuerdos - 1987
 Se me hace agüita la boca - 1990
 Sentimientos - 1994
 Regreso - 2000
 Ámame tal como soy - 2001
 La Historia de Carlos Torres Vila - 2005
 Carlos Torres Vila - 2005
 Por siempre romántico - 2007
 El Autor - 2009

References

1946 births
2010 deaths
Argentine folk singers